Yaqub Bazar (also Romanized as Ya‘qūb Bāzār) is a village in Bahu Kalat Rural District, Dashtiari District, Chabahar County, Sistan and Baluchestan Province, Iran. It had 240 residents in 47 families as of the 2006 Census.

References 

Populated places in Chabahar County